Jesús de Machaca is a location in the La Paz Department, Bolivia. It is the seat of the Jesús de Machaca Municipality, the sixth municipal section of the Ingavi Province, and of the Jesús de Machaca Canton. In 2001 it had a population of 396.

Transport 
There are daily buses from El Alto to Jesús de Machaca. 'The trip takes about three hours. Part of the road is paved.

El Alto - Viacha (23 km).
Viacha - Chama (42 km).
Chama - Jesús de Machaca (23.5 km).

References

External links 
 Jesús de Machaca Municipality: population data and map (PDF; 311 kB)

Populated places in La Paz Department (Bolivia)